Stanislav V'Soske (1899–1983) was an American carpet designer and manufacturer, known as "the dean of American rug design" and the co-founder of V'Soske Inc.

V'Soske's carpets are held in collections and exhibits at the Museum of Modern Art, Cooper Hewitt, Smithsonian Design Museum, and formerly the White House.

References 

1899 births
1983 deaths